I Wanna Be Your Pants is the third album by Huffamoose, released in 2000.

Production
The album was recorded without founding drummer Erik Johnson.

Critical reception
The Sun-Herald wrote that "at their prime, Philadelphia's Huffamoose deliver a reasonably punchy brand of melodic, stoner pop."

Track list

References

2000 albums
Huffamoose albums
Shanachie Records albums